Francis Vernon Cole (May 26, 1938 – June 23, 1972) was a Canadian football player who played for the Winnipeg Blue Bombers. He played college football at the University of North Texas. He died in 1972 after a long illness.

References

1938 births
1972 deaths
American football quarterbacks
Canadian football quarterbacks
American players of Canadian football
North Texas Mean Green football players
Montreal Alouettes players
Winnipeg Blue Bombers players
Players of American football from Texas
Sportspeople from the Dallas–Fort Worth metroplex
People from Pilot Point, Texas